Tom Jolls (born August 16, 1933) is a retired television personality best known for his 34-year tenure at WKBW-TV in Buffalo, New York. At WKBW, Jolls hosted "The Weather Outside" segments during Eyewitness News, performed many of the station's voiceovers, and served as children's host Commander Tom.

Tom Jolls was born in Newfane, New York. Jolls grew up in Lockport, New York, where he worked at WUSJ from 1951 to 1962. He moved to Buffalo, working for WBEN (AM)/TV, and in 1965 was effectively traded to WKBW-TV in exchange for Stan Barron; at WKBW, Jolls become the station's evening news weatherman. Before the end of the year, he was also hosting The Superman Show—interstitial segments featuring Jolls as Captain Tom, later Commander Tom, which aired around broadcasts of Adventures of Superman. The program evolved into The Commander Tom Show and would be on the air in various formats for 26 years.

Jolls, along with news anchor Irv Weinstein and sports anchor Rick Azar, were a nighttime fixture on WKBW. As host of "The Weather Outside," Jolls would stand out in the elements to report on weather conditions, and seeing him shivering or struggling to keep balance in gusty winds became common. Another one of Jolls's trademarks was his "Weather Word," a summation of the weather forecast in one word (a particular favorite of Jolls was salubrious, for beautiful weather), as well as ending his temperature listing by reminding us that it was "...and cooler by the lake!" He also maintained a weather stick as a forecasting aid; it was eventually broken apart by vandals.

Jolls never earned any certification in meteorology; he believed that the art of weather forecasting was simple enough that it did not require advanced meteorological training. (In attempting to convince Mike Randall, then a feature reporter, to get into weather forecasting, Jolls said "Weather is so easy, High pressure is nice weather, low pressure is bad weather.") He also maintained a subscription to Accuweather.

In 1992, Jolls reprised his Commander Tom character in a recurring role on the weekend morning kids' show Rocketship 7. It was cancelled after one year.

Azar retired in 1989, ending the 24-year run of the anchor team of Weinstein-Jolls-Azar. Weinstein retired in 1998, and Jolls left the air six months later, retiring on June 30, 1999. Mike Randall was named as his successor. Jolls had 6 children: Suzanne Marie, Thomas Dale, Kathleen Ann, Lisa Ann, Timothy Wilbert and Terrence Leo.

He currently splits his time with his wife Janice between two homes in Western New York and a home in Cape Coral, Florida.

Jolls, along with Weinstein and Azar, was inducted into the Buffalo Broadcasting Hall of Fame in 1998. Jolls was also inducted into the New York State Broadcasters Association Hall of Fame in 2019.

External links and sources

The Irv, Rick, and Tom Page Fan site by Buffalonian Steve Cichon

1933 births
Living people
American television personalities
Male television personalities
American male television actors
Television personalities from Buffalo, New York
People from Niagara County, New York
People from Lockport, New York